Emma Beddoes (29 August 1985 in Leamington Spa) is a former English professional squash player who represented England. She reached a career-high world ranking of World No. #11 in September 2015.

Career
Beddoes made her first Tour appearance in 2004 and went on to reach the world's top 50 in less than two years. She won her first Tour title at the 2007 Colombo Open where she defeated number one seed Tricia Chuah in straight games.

In 2014, she was part of the team that helped England reclaim the world team title by winning the gold medal at the 2014 Women's World Team Squash Championships. Also in 2014, she won the bronze medal at the 2014 Commonwealth Games, competing in the women's doubles with Alison Waters they reached the semi final stage before securing the medal by beating the Australian pair of Rachael Grinham and Kasey Brown.

She won her 10th Tour title at the Emerson RC Pro Series tournament in 2015, where she dropped just one game throughout the event. She retired in April 2016 after earning 25 caps for England and ten tour title wins.

References

External links 

English female squash players
Living people
1985 births
Sportspeople from Leamington Spa
Commonwealth Games bronze medallists for England
Squash players at the 2014 Commonwealth Games
Commonwealth Games medallists in squash
Competitors at the 2013 World Games
Medallists at the 2014 Commonwealth Games